The Big Chamorro Circus (Spanish: El gran circo Chamorro) is a 1955 Chilean comedy film directed by José Bohr and starring Eugenio Retes and Malú Gatica.

Plot
The story revolves around the life of Euríspides Chamorro (Retes), who worked various roles in a circus, including ticket-taker and clown, to finance his son Fernando's (Guixé) medical studies. One day, he receives a telegram informing him that his son had completed his degree. Proud of his son's achievement, Euríspides travels to Santiago to find him, but is devastated to discover that Fernando had dropped out of college years ago and was spending his nights at a boîte in the capital. Additionally, the telegram was a lie invented by one of Euríspides' employees to steal the circus from him. Despite the setbacks, Euríspides is determined to get back on his feet and reclaim the circus. He takes on various jobs, but with mixed results. Throughout it all, however, he maintains his Chilean charm and humor, entertaining with jokes and well-crafted musical scenes.

Cast
 Eugenio Retes as Euríspides Chamorro
 Pepe Guixé as Fernando Chamorro
 Elsa Villa
 Gerardo Grez
 Malú Gatica as Margarita Mendizabal

References

External links 
 

1955 films
1955 comedy films
Chilean comedy films
1950s Spanish-language films
Chilean black-and-white films
Films directed by José Bohr